"I Don't Believe in Goodbye" is a song written by Mark Miller, Bryan White and Scotty Emerick, and recorded by American country music group Sawyer Brown.  It was released in March 1995 as the second single from their compilation album Greatest Hits 1990-1995.  The song reached number 4 on the Billboard Hot Country Singles & Tracks chart.

Chart performance
"I Don't Believe in Goodbye" debuted at number 55 on the U.S. Billboard Hot Country Singles & Tracks for the week of March 18, 1995.

Year-end charts

References

1995 singles
1994 songs
Sawyer Brown songs
Songs written by Scotty Emerick
Songs written by Mark Miller (musician)
Songs written by Bryan White
Music videos directed by Michael Salomon
Curb Records singles